Forgue is a hamlet in Aberdeenshire. The Glendronach distillery is located in Forgue.

Notable residents
 George Bartlet, Dean of Aberdeen and Orkney
 Sir George Stuart Forbes, Indian civil servant
 John Fordyce, missionary
 George Garden, religious controversialist
 General Sir Alexander Leith, British soldier
 J Cameron Peddie, preacher
 John Stuart, archivist and genealogist
 Thomas Thain, Canadian politician
 George Thom, mathematician and educator
Bell Duncan, Scottish traditional singer

See also 
 Listed buildings in Forgue

References

External links
 A history of Forgue

Hamlets in Scotland
Villages in Aberdeenshire